Beilschmiedia ugandensis is a species of plant in the family Lauraceae. It is found in the Democratic Republic of the Congo, Sudan, Tanzania, and Uganda. It is threatened by habitat loss.

References

ugandensis
Vulnerable plants
Taxonomy articles created by Polbot